Shadi Ahdy Iskandar (Arabic: شادي عهدي إسكندر; Russian: Шади Ахди; born 27 July 1993) is an Egyptian retired footballer.

Career

Ahdy started his career with Wadi Degla SC, where his father was president, scoring 3 goals on his debut against Kahraba Talkha in the cup. He then helped Wadi Degla SC reach the 2012-13 Egypt Cup final before going on loan to Belgian second division side Lierse S.K., where he failed to make an appearance, before being sent on loan again, this time to El Gouna. After an unsuccessful trial with German Bundesliga side Hannover 96, Ahdy signed for Stuttgarter Kickers in the German lower leagues, where he again failed to make an appearance.

In 2016, he signed for Zimbru Chișinău, one of the most successful clubs in Moldova, becoming the first Egyptian to play in the country.

In 2013, he gained attention for joining the Egypt under-20 national team as a Christian.

References

External links
 Shadi Ahdy at Soccerway

Egyptian footballers
Living people
1993 births
Association football forwards
Wadi Degla SC players
FC Zimbru Chișinău players
Moldovan Super Liga players
Egyptian Christians
Egyptian expatriate footballers
Expatriate footballers in Belgium
Egyptian expatriate sportspeople in Belgium
Expatriate footballers in Germany
Egyptian expatriate sportspeople in Germany
Expatriate footballers in Moldova
Egyptian expatriate sportspeople in Moldova